Never Ran, Never Will: Boyhood and Football in a Changing American Inner City  is a nonfiction book by Albert Samaha about a youth football team in Brownsville, Brooklyn, New York. The book was published on September 4, 2018 by PublicAffairs. It was named one of Booklist’s Top 10 Sports Nonfiction books of 2018 and received the 2019 New York Society Library Hornblower Award.

Synopsis 
The book tells the story of the Mo Better Jaguars, a youth football team in the Brownsville area of Brooklyn, during the 2013–2014 season. The team is composed of players aged 7–13 years old who struggle to win games. Never Ran, Never Will chronicles the efforts of the six team coaches and head coach Chris Legree as they work to keep the young, mostly African American players inspired in a neighborhood undergoing gentrification.

Awards and nominations 
 2019 - PEN/ESPN Literary Sports Writing Award, Finalist
2019 - New York Society Library Hornblower Award
For audiobook:
2018 - Earphones Award, AudioFile Magazine

Critical reception 
Never Ran, Never Will received positive critical reception. Wes Lukowsky wrote for Booklist in a starred review, "Samaha takes readers by the hand and leads them on a visceral tour of a peril-filled world that, nevertheless, thanks to people like Legree, can also become a seeding ground for hope." Publishers Weekly wrote, "At the heart of Samaha's unflinching book are the life-affirming themes of sports, transcendence, courage, and manhood."

Publication

References

External links 
Official website

American non-fiction books
American football books
2018 non-fiction books
English-language books
PublicAffairs books